Krešimir I was king of Croatia from 935 until his death in 945. He was a member of the Trpimirović dynasty.

Reign 
Little is known about the reign of Krešimir I. He succeeded Trpimir II as king in around 935. According to De Administrando Imperio, Krešimir managed to maintain Croatia's military power. 

After his death his two sons, first Miroslav and later Michael Krešimir II, became kings, after a long struggle for succession.

Footnotes

References

Krešimir I among native kings of Croatia
Krešimir I in the book "History of Croatia I" written by Ph.D. Rudolf Horvat

Kings of Croatia
10th-century Croatian monarchs
Year of birth unknown
945 deaths
Roman Catholic monarchs
Trpimirović dynasty